Lewis Pate "Bud" McFadin (August 21, 1928 – February 13, 2006) was an American football player.  He played college football at the University of Texas and was a unanimous selection at the guard position on the 1950 College Football All-America Team.  He later played professional football in the National Football League (NFL) for the Los Angeles Rams (1952–1956) and in the American Football League (AFL) for the Denver Broncos (1960–1963) and Houston Oilers (1964–1965). A versatile player, he played tackle and linebacker on defense, as well as tackle and guard on offense.  He was a Pro Bowl pick in 1955 and 1956, a Sporting News All-AFL defensive tackle in 1960, 1961 and 1962, and an American Football League West Division All-Star in 1963.

McFadin was inducted into the College Football Hall of Fame in 1983.

See also

List of Texas Longhorns football All-Americans
List of Los Angeles Rams first-round draft picks
Other American Football League players

References

External links
McFadin's 1962 Fleer football card
NFL.com player page
Obit from the Los Angeles Times

1928 births
2006 deaths
All-American college football players
People from Upton County, Texas
American football defensive tackles
American football linebackers
American football guards
American football offensive tackles
Texas Longhorns football players
Los Angeles Rams players
Denver Broncos (AFL) players
Houston Oilers players
Western Conference Pro Bowl players
American Football League All-Star players
American Football League All-League players
College Football Hall of Fame inductees
American Football League players